Molten salt is salt which is solid at standard temperature and pressure but enters the liquid phase due to elevated temperature. Regular table salt has a melting point of 801 °C (1474 °F) and a heat of fusion of 520 J/g.

A salt that is normally liquid even at standard temperature and pressure is usually called a room temperature ionic liquid, and so technically molten salts are a class of ionic liquids.

Uses
Molten salts have a variety of uses. Molten chloride salt mixtures are commonly used as baths in devices called molten salt reactors for various alloy heat treatments, such as annealing and martempering of steel. Cyanide and chloride salt mixtures are used for surface modification of alloys such as carburizing and nitrocarburizing of steel.

Cryolite (a fluoride salt) is used as a solvent for aluminium oxide in the production of aluminium in the Hall-Héroult process.

Fluoride, chloride, and hydroxide salts can be used as solvents in pyroprocessing of nuclear fuel.

Molten salts (fluoride, chloride, and nitrate) can be used as heat transfer fluids as well as for thermal storage. This thermal storage is commonly used in concentrated solar power plants.

A commonly used thermal salt is the eutectic mixture of 60% sodium nitrate and 40% potassium nitrate, which can be used as liquid between 260-550 °C. It has a heat of fusion of 161 J/g, and a heat capacity of 1.53 J/(g K).

Experimental salts using lithium  can be formed that have a melting point of 116 °C while still having a heat capacity of 1.54 J/(g K).
Salts may cost $1,000 per ton, and a typical plant may use 30,000 tons of salt.

Ambient temperature molten salts
Ambient temperature molten salts (also known as ionic liquids) are present in the liquid phase at standard conditions for temperature and pressure. Examples of such salts include N-ethylpyridinium bromide and aluminium chloride mix, discovered in 1951 and ethylammonium nitrate discovered by Paul Walden. Other ionic liquids take advantage of asymmetrical quaternary ammonium cations like alkylated imidazolium ions, and large, branched anions like the bistriflimide ion.

See also
Electromagnetic pump
Molten salt battery
Molten salt reactor
Parabolic trough
Molten salt oxidation
United States Department of Energy International Energy Storage Database
Ionic liquid

References

External links

Proc. Roy. Soc.

Bibliography
C.F. Baes, The chemistry and thermodynamics of molten salt reactor fuels, Proc. AIME Nuclear Fuel Reprocessing Symposium, Ames, Iowa, USA, 1969 (August 25)

Energy storage
Metallurgical processes
Inorganic solvents
Ionic liquids